The Sunrisers Drum and Bugle Corps is an all-age, or senior, drum corps from Long Island, New York. The corps is a member of Drum Corps Associates (DCA), and  competes in Open Class.

The Sunrisers began as the Marine Memorial Drum and Bugle Corps of Nassau County in 1950. Originally a junior corps, the corps was reorganized as a "senior" corps in 1953.

In June 2022, the Sunrisers announced that their 2022 season would be cancelled, citing increased costs and reduced membership.

History 
The name was originated when Hodge, while listening to the radio, heard the song, "The World is Waiting for the Sunrise" by Les Paul and Mary Ford. Immediately, Hodge called Ray Nicholas, the bugle instructor, and told him of his idea to change the name of the corps to the "Sunrisers".

From 1954–1957, the Sunrisers became one of the foremost corps in the Tri-State area, performing in parades, exhibitions, and standstill competitions.

They went on to march in field competitions and joined DCA in 1966. That year, the corps placed second to the Hawthorne Caballeros Drum and Bugle Corps, of Hawthorne, NJ, by 1.10 points. With continued improvement, the Sunrisers won the American Legion National Championship in 1968 and proved to be a steady contender in the DCA circuit.

The Sunrisers improved their standing in DCA. In 1977, they were "neck-and-neck" with the Caballeros all season, neither corps losing a competition until DCA preliminary competition. The Sunrisers displayed one of their finest performances all season at the prelims, defeating the Cabs by three points. The next day at finals, held at J. Birney Crum Stadium in Allentown, PA, the championship came down to the final two corps, the Caballeros and the Sunrisers. The Sunrisers were awarded first place over the Cabs by only five-hundredths of a point, giving the corps their first DCA World Championship.

The following season began slowly but finished with the Sunrisers slipping past the Cabs by .05 at prelims and by three points at the championship finals. The 1978 Sunrisers became the first DCA corps to earn a perfect score in the Brass GE (general effect) category.

The corps couldn't win the "three-peat" in 1979, placing 3rd. They did not win another championship until 1982 but then won back-to-back in 1983,  giving Sun their third and fourth championships.

In 1985, the Sunrisers moved to New Jersey after their long history on Long Island.  The 1987 season was known as the "rain-out" year because the DCA Championship finals were canceled due to the weather. The Sunrisers had won the preliminary competition by two points. With the field being covered in wet mud, making marching conditions poor, the decision was made to cancel the finals competition and award the championship based on the prelims scores. This gave Sun its fifth championship. In 1988, they tied the Bushwackers Drum and Bugle Corps of New Jersey for the championship, the first such tie in DCA history. In 1989, although tying the Bushwackers again at the championships, the official title was awarded to the Bushwackers under a new tie-breaking rule which used the overall general effect score for the final decision.

After that year, Sun started to set. In 1991, the corps missed participating in the ten corps finals for the first time, by slipping to eleventh place. The corps was declared inactive in 1993, but remained in stand-still competition as a "mini-corps". In 1994 the corps again returned to field competition, where they enjoyed a resurgence, finishing among the top ten corps for the next six years.  The corps hit its peak in 1997, taking 4th place with a score of 92.00, playing a challenging show featuring the music of David Holsinger.  The corps was also well-known for its excellent color guards during this time, capturing the DCA Best Color Guard title in 1996 and 1999.  They went back to an inactive state for three seasons beginning in 2000. 

Having again returned to field competition, the corps has been continually improving. In 2007, the Sunrisers won the DCA Class A World Championship.  The corps recorded a then-record high Class A score of 83.988 in the finals competition and captured Best Percussion, Brass, Visual, and Overall Effect awards.

The Sunrisers returned to Long Island in late 2008, after an almost 25-year absence.  The corps 2011 repertoire was Les Miserables, marking the 15th anniversary of the corps performance of Les Mis in 1996, a season which began their return to prominence. The corps has been steadily improving ever since, regaining Open Class status in 2013, just missing finals in 11th place. They returned to Open Class Finals in 2015, after a 15-year absence, placing 9th. The Sunrisers 2016 show was entitled House of Cards. Moving up the standings yet again, the corps placed 8th with a score of 88.53.

External links 
 
 
 

Nassau County, New York
Drum Corps Associates corps
1953 establishments in New York (state)